Kochanoor is a village in the Thrissur district of Kerala, South India, India. It is situated near the village of Vadakkekad. Before Indian independence, Kochanoor was on the border of the former provinces of Malabar and Thirukochi. It has around 3 thousand of population which contains 80% Muslims and 20% Hindus.

Transport
  The nearest railway station is at Guruvayoor.

References

External links

 Website of Kochanoor

Villages in Thrissur district